Restaurant Insider is a monthly culinary magazine that conducts in-depth profiles on the restaurant industry's best known chefs and restaurateurs. The magazine began publishing in April 2005 as a trade-only magazine and has expanded to include newsstand availability, presence at food festivals, trade shows, and through online marketing.

Major profiles include:
 Daniel Boulud
 Anthony Bourdain
 Terrance Brennan
 Tom Colicchio
 Thomas Keller
 Alfred Portale
 Gordon Ramsay
 Eric Ripert
 Charlie Trotter
 Tom Valenti

See also
 List of food and drink magazines

External links
 Official Website

Monthly magazines published in the United States
Food and drink magazines
Magazines established in 2005
Magazines published in Connecticut